Lisa Kay Orr is an American potter and a teacher of ceramics. Orr has work in both public and private collections, and shows her work nationally as well as internationally.  Orr's work can be see in the Fine Arts Museum of San Francisco and in Korea in the collection of the WOCEF.

Education
Orr earned her Bachelor of Fine Arts in 1983 from the University of Texas in Austin. She did post-graduate studies at the Southwest Craft Center in San Antonio and the University of Minnesota in Minneapolis. In addition, she studied with Betty Woodman at the University of Colorado in Boulder in 1989, before earning her Masters of Fine Arts at the New York State College of Ceramics at Alfred University in 1992.

Studio work
Orr works in earthenware clay, using a variety of processes that include using the potter's wheel as well as a ram press and press molds, often using multiple processes to produce one piece. Her work, which includes platters, bowls and plates, are organic in form and functional in purpose.

Orr's work is primarily influenced by Mexican folk pottery and is characterized by the terra sigillata, stamps, slips and sprigs she uses to finish the surface, and by her layers of multi-colored glazes.

Orr believes that studio pottery is artistically significant and as a result and in collaboration with five other artists, co-founded the Art of the Pot studio tour.  This is an invitational tour where nationally known potters are invited to show their work along with the collaborators in their studios.

She has been awarded grants including a Fulbright, National Endowment for the Arts and the Mid-America Arts Alliance.

Public Collections
American Museum of Ceramic Art, Pomona, California
ArtStream Ceramic Library, Denver, Colorado
Fine Arts Museums of San Francisco, San Francisco, California
International Museum of Dinnerware Design, Ann Arbor, Michigan
Kennedy Museum of Art, Ohio University, Athens, Ohio
The Rosenfield Collection
San Angelo Museum of Fine Arts, San Angelo, Texas
San Antonio Museum of Art, San Antonio, Texas
Schein-Joseph International Museum of Ceramic Arts, Alfred University, Alfred, New York
South Texas Institute for the Arts, Corpus Christi, Texas
Yeoju World Ceramic Livingware Gallery, Icheon, South Korea

Publications
Orr, Lisa. “Studio Visit.” Ceramics Monthly (September 2011).
___. “Backwards into the Future: Technology and Sustainability.” The Studio Potter (2008).
___. “Synaesthesia: A Potter’s Experience and Research.” The Studio Potter (2006).
___.  “A Macedonian Pottery Village.” The Studio Potter (Spring 1998).

Further reading
“Up Front, Review: The Visceral Vessel.” Ceramics Monthly (November 2005).
“Up Front, Art of the Pot Show.” Ceramics Monthly “ (May, 2005).
“Utilitarian III-Symposium Insights.” Clay Times (January/February 2001).
'Diverse Domain, Contemporary North American Ceramic Art, Catalog.  Taipei, Taiwan: Yingge County Ceramics Museum, 2005.
Dormer, Peter. The New Ceramics: Trends+Traditions. 2nd ed. New York, New York: Thames and Hudson, 1995.
Galloway, Julia, ed. 500 Vases. Asheville, North Carolina: Lark Books, 2010.
Kopp, Linda. The Best of 500 Ceramics. Asheville, North Carolina: Lark Crafts, 2012.
Molina-Rodriguez, Rafael. “A Dialogue with Lisa Orr.” Ceramics Monthly (May 2000).
Peters, Lynn. Surface Decoration for Low-Fire Ceramics. Asheville, North Carolina: Lark Books, 1999.
Wilson, Lana.  “Sprigging: Casual and Unconventional.”  Clay Times'' (December 2003).

References

Year of birth missing (living people)
Living people
American potters
University of Texas at Austin alumni
University of Minnesota alumni
New York State College of Ceramics alumni
Women potters